George A. Heubel (June 20, 1849–January 22, 1896) was a German American professional baseball player. He was the first player born in Germany to play in the National Association and the National League.

Career
Heubel started his amateur career in 1867 with the Quaker City team. In , he was the left fielder for the Cleveland Forest Citys.

He batted .307 in 17 games (the team played 28 in total), and the Athletics won the first NA pennant. In , he played five games in center field for the Washington Olympics and then retired as a player.

He also played one game for the New York Mutuals. In , he managed the Allentown Peanut Eaters of the Pennsylvania State Association.

Heubel later became a groundskeeper for the Philadelphia Phillies. In 1894, however, he was held responsible for a fire at the ballpark and was subsequently fired.

Heubel was also a clerk. He died in 1896, at the age of 46, and was buried in Leverington Cemetery in Philadelphia, Pennsylvania.

See also
List of Major League Baseball players from Europe

References

External links

1849 births
1896 deaths
19th-century baseball players
19th-century baseball umpires
Accidental deaths from falls
Cleveland Forest Citys (NABBP) players
German emigrants to the United States
Major League Baseball outfielders
Major League Baseball players from Germany
Major League Baseball umpires
Minor league baseball managers
New York Mutuals players
Philadelphia Athletics (NA) players
Philadelphia Athletics (NABBP) players
Philadelphia Geary players
Washington Olympics players